Jan Herbert Bruell (December 27, 1920 – January 21, 1997) was a Polish-born American psychologist and geneticist known for his work in behavioral and medical genetics. He was a professor in the psychology department at the University of Texas at Austin from 1968 until his death in 1997. He was a founding member of the Behavior Genetics Association, and served as editor-in-chief of its flagship journal, Behavior Genetics, from 1978 to 1986.

References

External links
List of Professors Emeriti in the Department of Psychology at the University of Texas at Austin

Polish emigrants to the United States
1920 births
1997 deaths
People from Bielsko
Heidelberg University alumni
Clark University alumni
20th-century American psychologists
American geneticists
Behavior geneticists
Case Western Reserve University faculty
University of Texas at Austin faculty
Academic journal editors
20th-century American zoologists
Polish expatriates in Germany
American psychologists